Nicolás Jarry Fillol (born 11 October 1995) is a Chilean professional tennis player. He achieved his highest ATP singles ranking of world No. 38 in July 2019 and is the current Chilean No. 1. His highest doubles ranking of world No. 40 was achieved in March 2019. He has won two ATP titles in singles at Båstad 2019 and Santiago 2023. He also has won two titles in doubles on the ATP Tour.

Personal life
He is the grandson of Jaime Fillol, a former ATP player who won seven titles, and the great-nephew of Álvaro Fillol. His aunt, Catalina Fillol, is the tournament director of the  Chile Open in Santiago, Chile.

Career

Junior and early career
Jarry reached the final of the 2013 French Open in boys' doubles, partnering with Cristian Garín were defeated by Kyle Edmund and Frederico Ferreira Silva. Jarry ended the year no. 18 in junior rankings.

Jarry was called for the Chile Davis Cup team for the first time in September 2013 in the rubber against Dominican Republic. Chile lost and was relegated to the Group II of Americas Zone.

2015–16: Pro debut, top 200 and constant injuries
In February 2015 Jarry played his first match on an ATP tournament, after qualifying in the 2015 Ecuador Open Quito. Nicolás won his first match against local Gonzalo Escobar, but in second round lost to Dušan Lajović. The points of this tournament helped him reach a top 200 position in the ranking ATP, but through the year he lost positions for constant injuries.

At the end of 2016, Jarry won three ITF Futures in his home country (two of them in consecutive weeks), ending the year as no. 330.

2017: Three Challenger titles, Major & top 100 debuts
Jarry started his 2017 with a final in Morelos Open challenger, and another one in Santiago. After these two lost finals, he was able to enter the qualifying competition for the 2017 French Open, where he won all the matches and entered the main tournament. In his first match in a Grand Slam, he lost in four sets to Karen Khachanov. Nicolás repeated the success in the qualifying competition for 2017 Wimbledon Championships, reaching the main draw and losing to Gilles Simon in straight sets.

In the second half of the year, Nicolás won three challenger tournaments: at Medellín, Quito, and Santiago.

Jarry ended the year as No. 100.

2018: First ATP finals & top 40, Maiden ATP doubles title 
Jarry entered a Grand Slam main draw directly for the first time in 2018 Australian Open, but lost in straight sets to Leonardo Mayer. After Australia, Nicolás played for Chile in Davis Cup competition, winning his two singles matches against Ecuador and partnering with Hans Podlipnik for a victory in doubles, resulting in a 3–1 win for Chile.

The following week, Nicolás took part of 2018 Ecuador Open Quito, where he reached quarterfinals of an ATP Tour tournament for the first time. Jarry repeated the partnership with Podlipnik in the doubles tournament, and they won the championship, a maiden ATP title for both.

Two weeks after Quito, Nicolás surpassed his best results at the 2018 Rio Open, reaching his first semifinal of an ATP tournament, but losing against eventual champion Diego Schwartzman. The next tournament, he reached his first ATP final at the 2018 Brasil Open. He lost in the final to Fabio Fognini. This effort took him to career best ranking of world No. 61.

After reaching the quarterfinals at the 2018 Estoril Open and losing in the first round of the 2018 French Open, Nicolás won his first match in a Grand Slam at 2018 Wimbledon, defeating 28th seed Filip Krajinović in four sets. He lost to Mackenzie McDonald in five sets in the second round. Few weeks later at the 2018 German Open quarterfinals, Jarry had the best win of his career up to that moment, toppling top seed Dominic Thiem in straight sets before losing in the semifinals.

In the following months, Jarry had good runs in small tournaments, reaching the semifinals in 2018 German Open and in 2018 Generali Open Kitzbühel, and the quarterfinals in 2018 Winston-Salem Open. With these results, Jarry jumped to the No. 42 in the rankings. In his first US Open, he reached the second round in singles and the quarterfinals in doubles. After the US Open, the only notable result for Jarry was reaching the third round of 2018 Shanghai Masters, where he defeated Marin Čilić in three sets in second round, having the best win of his career yet. He lost to Kyle Edmund in the following round. With the points from this achievement, weeks later he would get to world No. 39. Prior to that, he served as the alternate for Team World at the 2018 Laver Cup in Chicago.

2019: First ATP singles title 

Jarry lost in four sets to Leonardo Mayer in their second consecutive first round match at Australian Open. Nicolás won his two singles points against Jurij Rodionov and Dennis Novak in the series of Chile against Austria for 2019 Davis Cup; with another win from Cristian Garín, the Chilean team earned their spot at the 2019 Davis Cup Finals, at the end of the year.

At third round of the 2019 Barcelona Open, Jarry defeated 2nd seed and then ATP ranking #3 Alexander Zverev in three sets, marking a new best win of his career. Nicolás lost in the following round to Daniil Medvedev. One month later, Jarry and Zverev would clash again in the final of the 2019 Geneva Open, extending again the match until the tie break of the third set, but Zverev emerged victorious 3–6, 6–3, 6–7(8–10). The following week, Jarry lost in first round of the 2019 French Open in four sets to 8th seed Juan Martín del Potro.

After a regular grass season which featured the quarterfinals in the 2019 Rosmalen Grass Court Championships and wins over Stefanos Tsitsipas and Pablo Cuevas, Jarry went back to clay in July. At the 2019 Swedish Open, he lifted his first ATP title after defeating Henri Laaksonen, Mikael Ymer, Jérémy Chardy, Federico Delbonis and Juan Ignacio Londero without losing a single set, completing the best week of his career so far and reaching a new career-high ranking of World No. 38 on 22 July 2019.

2020: Provisional suspension
During the Davis Cup Finals in late 2019, Jarry tested positive for Ligandrol and Stanozolol. He was suspended from competition as of 14 January 2020 but subsequently cleared as the ITF ruled that Jarry "bore no significant fault or negligence for his violation." The ban expired on 15 November 2020, with Jarry entering the 2020 Lima Challenger via wildcards in singles and doubles.

2021: Two Challenger titles and back to top 150
Jarry played many ATP and Challenger tournaments in South America via wildcards. He defeated Jaume Munar at Córdoba, losing to Benoît Paire on second round. The following week, Jarry lost to Frances Tiafoe at the home city tournament Santiago, after defending 6 match points.

In April, he won a challenger at Salinas, and reached the final on another one at the same city. Three months later, he reached another final at Lüdenscheid, Germany.

In October, Jarry won his second Challenger of the year, at Lima. He defeated Juan Manuel Cerúndolo 6–2, 7–5 in the final. This title moved Jarry to World No. 162, on 1 November 2021, his best ranking after his suspension.

2022–23: Return to Grand Slams, Second title & top 60, Chilean No. 1

At the 2022 Swiss Open Gstaad he reached the quarterfinals as a qualifier where he lost to Albert Ramos Viñolas in a tight three sets match. As a result, he reached world No. 104 on 1 August 2022, his highest ranking since the 2020 suspension.
After a two years absence he qualified for the 2022 US Open.

He also qualified for the 2023 Australian Open after three years of absence. He won his first Grand Slam match, at this Major and in more than four years at any Major, defeating 26th seed Miomir Kecmanovic.

Ranked No. 139 at the 2023 Rio Open he recorded his biggest win of the season thus far defeating world No. 18 Lorenzo Musetti in the first round. Next he defeated Pedro Martinez to return to the quarterfinals at this tournament in five years (since 2018), this time as a qualifier. As a result he moved close to 40 positions up the rankings a couple of positions shy of the top 100. Next he defeated 6th seed Sebastián Báez to reach his first ATP semifinal in more than three years (since Bastad in July 2019). He moved another 15 positions, for a total of 52 positions to No. 87 in the rankings on 27 February 2023 becoming the Chilean No. 1 player. He lost to top seed and world No. 2 Carlos Alcaraz in three sets.
The following week he received a Special Exempt (having reached the semifinals the week before) to play in his home tournament, the 2023 Chile Open in Santiago. His good form continued as he defeated Peruvian Juan Pablo Varillas in the first round. Next he defeated fourth seed Diego Schwartzman to make the quarterfinals. He reached back-to-back semifinals defeating Yannick Hanfmann. He reached his first final since 2019 defeating third seed Jaume Munar. As a result he returned to the top 70 in the rankings. In the final, he defeated first time ATP finalist Tomás Martín Etcheverry in three sets to win his second title, this time on home soil. As a result, he returned to the top 60 at world No. 52 on 6 March 2023, 100 spots higher than he started the season.

ATP career finals

Singles: 4 (2 titles, 2 runners-up)

Doubles: 2 (2 titles)

ATP Challenger Tour and ITF Futures finals

Singles: 21 (11–10)

Doubles: 23 (15–8)

Junior Grand Slam finals

Doubles finals: 1 (1 runner-up)

Performance timelines

Singles
Current through the 2023 Rio Open.

Doubles

Wins over top-10 opponents 
He has a 4–4 (.500) record against players who were, at the time the match was played, ranked in the top 10.

Records against other players
 Statistics correct .

Record against top-10 players

Record against No. 11-20 players
Jarry's record against players who have been ranked world No. 11-20:

 Pablo Cuevas 2–0
 Albert Ramos Viñolas 2–2
 Marcel Granollers 1–0
 Lorenzo Musetti 1–0
 Andreas Seppi 1–1
 Frances Tiafoe 1–1
 Guido Pella 1–1
 Nikoloz Basilashvili 0–1
 Philipp Kohlschreiber 0–1
 Alex de Minaur 0–1
 Kyle Edmund 0–2
 Benoît Paire 0–4

 Statistics correct .

Notes

References

External links
 
 
 

1995 births
Living people
Chilean male tennis players
Chilean people of French descent
Chilean people of Catalan descent
Chilean people of English descent
Tennis players at the 2015 Pan American Games
Pan American Games gold medalists for Chile
Pan American Games medalists in tennis
South American Games silver medalists for Chile
South American Games medalists in tennis
Competitors at the 2014 South American Games
Doping cases in tennis
Tennis players at the 2019 Pan American Games
Medalists at the 2015 Pan American Games
Medalists at the 2019 Pan American Games
Tennis players from Santiago
21st-century Chilean people